Rosemary Esehagu (born 15 November 1981) is a Nigerian writer. She was born and raised in Lagos, Nigeria, to a family of six children. In 1997, she came to the United States to advance her education. She attended Williams College, a prestigious liberal arts school in Williamstown, Massachusetts, where she earned a BA in Psychology. Her first novel, The Looming Fog, was published in 2006. She lives in the District of Columbia and is finishing her second novel.

References

External links
 Rosemary Esehagu blog
Full text of article by Rosemary Esehagu called "A call to dream"
The Rosemary Esehagu Website
Rosemary Esehagu at the Internet Book List

1981 births
Living people
Nigerian women novelists
Writers from Lagos
20th-century Nigerian novelists
21st-century Nigerian novelists
20th-century Nigerian women writers
21st-century Nigerian women writers
Nigerian emigrants to the United States
Williams College alumni